Valkyrien Allstars (established 2003 in Oslo, Norway) is a Norwegian Hardingfele Trio whose music is based on Norwegian traditional folk music. They present many different genres and styles with a very distinctive sound.

In 2006 Valkyrien Allstars was awarded Grappa's Debutant prize and received a recording contract under the direction of Grappa Music Publishing. Their debut album Valkyrien Allstars was released 1 October 2007 on the label Heilo. The band was nominated for Spellemannprisen 2007 in the open class Newcomer of the Year, and the album gained platinum album status in 2008. On 31 August 2009 they released their second album To Måner, and the third Ingen Hverdag in 2011, all of which were under the Heilo label.

Band members 

Standard lineup
Tuva Syvertsen (Vocals, Hardingfele, Accordion)
Erik Sollid (Vocals, Hardingfele, Mandolin)

Additional musicians
Magnus Larsen (Double bass)
Martin Langlie (Drums)

Former members
Ola Hilmen (Hardingfele)

Honors 

Gammleng-prisen 2012 in the category Traditional folk music

Discography 

2007: Valkyrien Allstars (Heilo)
2009: To Måner (Heilo)
2011: Ingen Hverdag (Heilo)
2014: Farvel Slekt Og Venner (Heilo)
2016: Prøv å si noe til meg nå) (Heilo) (under the name Valkyrien)
2020: Slutte og byne'' (Heilo)

References

External links 

 

Spellemannprisen winners
Heilo Music artists
Norwegian rock music groups
Musical groups established in 2003
2003 establishments in Norway
Musical groups from Oslo